Niforeika (Greek: Νιφορέικα, also Νιφοραίικα) is a village and a community in the municipality of West Achaea in northwestern Achaea, Greece. It is located near the Gulf of Patras, 4 km east of Limnochori, 3 km west of Kato Achaia and 22 km southwest of Patras. The distance from the Greek National Road 9 (Patras - Pyrgos) is about 4 km.  The community consists of the villages Niforeika and Paralia Niforeikon.

See also
List of settlements in Achaea

References

Populated places in Achaea